Blood In, Blood Out is an album by Axe Murder Boyz. Released in 2006, it is the group's first nationally released album, and their first release on Psychopathic Records.

Conception

Background

Brothers James and Mike Garcia formed Axe Murder Boyz in 1999, naming their group after a lyric from the Insane Clown Posse song "Bring It On". After releasing a series of locally released albums on their own label, Axe Recordings, the Garcia brothers formed Canonize Productions in 2004. The following year, Psychopathic Records held an Underground Psychos contest at the year's Gathering of the Juggalos, which resulted in contenders AMB being awarded a one-album contract deal with the label.

Recording 

AMB began recording Blood In, Blood Out in 2005, and concluded production the following year. Mike E. Clark wrote much of the album's music, with other music created by Grammy Award winning producer Polar Bear, Psychopathic producer Fritz the Cat, and Joseph Bruce, who worked under the name Dr. Punch in his production credits. The entire album was produced by AMB themselves.

All tracks were recorded at Psychopathic's recording studio, the Lotus Pod in Detroit, Michigan, except for "Scream My Name", "Old Girl (All Mine)" and "Honor", which were recorded at Mike E. Clark's Funhouse Studio. "See Thru" was recorded at both studios. Joseph Utsler provided scratching, while Twiztid, Insane Clown Posse and Blaze Ya Dead Homie provided guest verses.

Reception 

Blood In, Blood Out peaked at #11 on the Billboard Top Heatseekers chart, #22 on the Top Independent Albums chart, #199 on the Top Internet Albums chart and #199 on the Billboard 200. Allmusic's review of the album found it appealing, writing, "Packed with thumping beats, dark, ominous samples, and raps full of cartoonish violence, AMB prove they are well on their way out of the underground and into the national limelight."

Track listing

Personnel 

Band members and production
 James Garcia  – vocals, lyrics, production
 Mike Garcia  – vocals, lyrics, production
 Mike E. Clark  – programmer, engineer
 Dr. Punch  – programmer, engineer
 Kuma  – programmer, engineer
 Polar Bear  – programmer, engineer
 Fritz "the Cat" Van Kosky  – programmer, engineer

Other personnel
Violent J – guest vocals, lyrics
Shaggy 2 Dope – guest vocals, lyrics
Jamie Madrox  – guest vocals, lyrics
Monoxide  – guest vocals, lyrics
Blaze Ya Dead Homie  – guest vocals, lyrics

References

2006 albums
Albums produced by Joseph Bruce
Albums produced by Mike E. Clark
Axe Murder Boyz albums
Horrorcore albums
Psychopathic Records albums